Yasser Portuondo (born February 2, 1983) is a male volleyball player from Cuba. He was a member of the Men's National Team that claimed the silver at the 2003 Pan American Games after losing to Venezuela in the final. There he was named Best Receiver of the tournament.

References
 FIVB Profile

1983 births
Living people
Cuban men's volleyball players
Volleyball players at the 2003 Pan American Games
Pan American Games silver medalists for Cuba
Expatriate volleyball players in Poland
BKS Visła Bydgoszcz players
Pan American Games medalists in volleyball
Medalists at the 2003 Pan American Games